Kerchkan or Karchekan or Karchakan may refer to:
 Karchekan, Isfahan
 Kerchkan, Kerman